Rossner or Roßner is a surname. Notable people with the surname include

Erich Rossner, Unterscharführer, in the Waffen SS during World War II who was awarded the Knight's Cross of the Iron Cross
Judith Rossner (1935–2005), American novelist
Petra Rossner (born 1966), German cyclist

See also
August (Rossner novel), novel written by Judith Rossner focused on a psychoanalyst and one of her analysands
Rössner